Cdc42-interacting protein 4 is a protein that in humans is encoded by the TRIP10 gene.

Interactions
TRIP10 has been shown to interact with STAT3, Wiskott-Aldrich syndrome protein, Huntingtin, CDC42, AKAP9 and RHOQ.

References

Further reading